Jeffrey Nigel Malone (born June 28, 1961) is an American former professional basketball player. He played college basketball at Mississippi State, and is mostly known for his time with the Washington Bullets (1983–1990) of the National Basketball Association (NBA), where he was an NBA All-Star twice, playing the shooting guard position. He also played for the Utah Jazz, Philadelphia 76ers, and Miami Heat.

Basketball career
Malone averaged 19.0 points per game over 13 years in the NBA. He was known for his capable offense, averaging more than 20 points in six full NBA seasons with Washington and Utah. In particular, Malone was adept at running his defender through a pick or series of screens, receiving a pass and hitting a quick mid-range jump shot.  Often, these shots were off-balance, either fading sideways or falling backwards away from hoop, but his accuracy remained lethal, even when well-defended. At times, Malone would go on a hot streak and score more than 15 points in a single quarter.

On January 3, 1984, Malone, during his rookie season, hit a game-winning 3-pointer against the Detroit Pistons as he fell out of bounds along the left baseline and lofted the basketball above the backboard and made it to give the Bullets a 103–102 lead with 1 second left. This shot was listed in a votable list of the NBA's greatest shots.  Malone emerged as one of the best scoring guards in the league over the next few years, appearing in the NBA All-Star Game in both 1986 and 1987.  He averaged a career-best 24.3 points per game with the Bullets in 1989-90, his last season with the team.

Malone was traded to the Jazz in the off-season, adding another offensive weapon to a team that already featured future Hall of Famers Karl Malone and John Stockton.  Jeff Malone averaged 18.6 points per game in his first year in Utah, and shot 91.7 percent on free throws, good for second in the league (narrowly losing the free throw title to Indiana's Reggie Miller, who shot 91.8 percent that season).  Malone averaged 20.2 points per game the following year, and was named NBA Player of the Week for December 8, 1991.  His scoring helped the Jazz to the Western Conference Finals that year, at that time the franchise's best-ever performance in the playoffs.  During the 1993-94 season, Malone was sent to the Philadelphia 76ers in a trade that brought Jeff Hornacek to Utah.

Jeff was hired as Smokey Gaines' assistant coach for the IBL Stingrays in July 1999. 

Malone also coached the NBA Development League's Columbus Riverdragons from 2001 to 2005, compiling a 102–98 record, before the franchise changed ownership and moved to Austin, Texas, renaming the team the Austin Toros and leaving Malone out of a job. He spent some time as the head coach of the Florida Flame until that team ceased operations in 2006, citing a lack of a suitable arena to play in.

Personal life
Malone resides in Chandler, Arizona, with his wife. He has four children; Jay, Joshua, Justin, and Jasmine Malone and one grandson Marshall Knutson-Malone.

Malone is the nephew of the late Vivian Malone Jones, the first African American graduate of the University of Alabama, and Dr. Sharon Malone Holder, wife of U.S. Attorney General Eric Holder.

He is not related to either former Jazz teammate Karl Malone or Moses Malone (with whom he was a teammate in Washington from 1986 to 1988).

NBA career statistics

Regular season

|-
| style="text-align:left;"|
| style="text-align:left;"|Washington
| 81 || 2 || 24.4 || .444 || .323 || .826 || 1.9 || 1.9 || .3 || .2 || 12.1
|-
| style="text-align:left;"|
| style="text-align:left;"|Washington
| 76 || 61 || 34.4 || .499 || .208 || .844 || 2.7 || 2.4 || .7 || .1 || 18.9
|-
| style="text-align:left;"|
| style="text-align:left;"|Washington
| 80 || 80 || 37.4 || .483 || .176 || .868 || 3.6 || 2.4 || .9 || .2 || 22.4
|-
| style="text-align:left;"|
| style="text-align:left;"|Washington
| 80 || 79 || 34.5 || .457 || .154 || .885 || 2.7 || 3.7 || .9 || .2 || 22.0
|-
| style="text-align:left;"|
| style="text-align:left;"|Washington
| 80 || 80 || 33.2 || .476 || .417 || .882 || 2.6 || 3.0 || .6 || .2 || 20.5
|-
| style="text-align:left;"|
| style="text-align:left;"|Washington
| 76 || 75 || 31.8 || .480 || .053 || .871 || 2.4 || 2.9 || .5 || .2 || 21.7
|-
| style="text-align:left;"|
| style="text-align:left;"|Washington
| 75 || 74 || 34.2 || .491 || .167 || .877 || 2.7 || 3.2 || .6 || .1 || 24.3
|-
| style="text-align:left;"|
| style="text-align:left;"|Utah
| 69 || 69 || 35.7 || .508 || .167 || .917 || 3.0 || 2.1 || .7 || .1 || 18.6
|-
| style="text-align:left;"|
| style="text-align:left;"|Utah
| 81 || 81 || 36.1 || .511 || .083 || .898 || 2.9 || 2.2 || .7 || .1 || 20.2
|-
| style="text-align:left;"|
| style="text-align:left;"|Utah
| 79 || 59 || 32.4 || .494 || .333 || .852 || 2.2 || 1.6 || .5 || .1 || 18.1
|-
| style="text-align:left;"|
| style="text-align:left;"|Utah
| 50 || 50 || 33.1 || .488 || .500 || .843 || 2.3 || 1.3 || .5 || .1 || 16.2
|-
| style="text-align:left;"|
| style="text-align:left;"|Philadelphia
| 27 || 23 || 33.4 || .481 || .667 || .809 || 3.1 || 2.2 || .5 || .0 || 16.8
|-
| style="text-align:left;"|
| style="text-align:left;"|Philadelphia
| 19 || 19 || 34.7 || .507 || .393 || .864 || 2.9 || 1.5 || .8 || .0 || 18.4
|-
| style="text-align:left;"|
| style="text-align:left;"|Philadelphia
| 25 || 3 || 16.3 || .394 || .313 || .923 || 1.3 || .8 || .5 || .0 || 6.2
|-
| style="text-align:left;"|
| style="text-align:left;"|Miami
| 7 || 0 || 14.7 || .394 ||  || .833 || 1.1 || 1.0 || .4 || .0 || 4.4
|- class="sortbottom"
| style="text-align:center;" colspan="2"|Career
| 905 || 755 || 32.8 || .484 || .268 || .871 || 2.6 || 2.4 || .6 || .1 || 19.0
|- class="sortbottom"
| style="text-align:center;" colspan="2"|All-Star
| 2 || 0 || 12.5 || .600 || .000 ||  || 1.5 || 3.0 || .5 || .0 || 6.0

Playoffs

|-
| style="text-align:left;"|1984
| style="text-align:left;”|Washington
| 4 ||  || 17.8 || .462 || .000 ||  || 1.3 || .5 || .3 || .0 || 6.0
|-
| style="text-align:left;"|1985
| style="text-align:left;”|Washington
| 4 || 4 || 31.5 || .482 || .333 || .769 || 1.5 || 2.0 || 1.3 || .0 || 16.3
|-
| style="text-align:left;"|1986
| style="text-align:left;”|Washington
| 5 || 5 || 39.4 || .408 || .000 || .897 || 3.2 || 3.4 || 1.4 || .6 || 22.0
|-
| style="text-align:left;"|1987
| style="text-align:left;”|Washington
| 3 || 3 || 35.0 || .370 ||  || 1.000 || 2.3 || 3.0 || .3 || .0 || 15.0
|-
| style="text-align:left;"|1988
| style="text-align:left;”|Washington
| 5 || 5 || 39.8 || .515 || .000 || .757 || 3.4 || 2.2 || 1.0 || 1.0 || 25.6
|-
| style="text-align:left;"|1991
| style="text-align:left;”|Utah
| 9 || 9 || 39.0 || .493 || .000 || .917 || 3.9 || 3.2 || 1.0 || .1 || 20.7
|-
| style="text-align:left;"|1992
| style="text-align:left;”|Utah
| 16 || 16 || 38.1 || .487 || .333 || .861 || 2.4 || 1.9 || .5 || .1 || 20.7
|-
| style="text-align:left;"|1993
| style="text-align:left;”|Utah
| 5 || 5 || 30.0 || .446 ||  || .692 || 3.2 || .6 || .6 || .2 || 13.4
|- class="sortbottom"
| style="text-align:center;" colspan="2"|Career
| 51 || 47 || 35.5 || .470 || .167 || .852 || 2.8 || 2.2 || .8 || .2 || 18.7

D-league Head Coach

References

External links

1961 births
Living people
African-American basketball coaches
African-American basketball players
All-American college men's basketball players
American expatriate basketball people in Greece
American men's basketball coaches
American men's basketball players
Basketball coaches from Alabama
Basketball players from Alabama
Columbus Riverdragons coaches
Continental Basketball Association coaches
Florida Flame coaches
International Basketball League (1999–2001) coaches
Miami Heat players
Mississippi State Bulldogs men's basketball players
National Basketball Association All-Stars
Philadelphia 76ers players
Shooting guards
Sportspeople from Mobile, Alabama
Utah Jazz players
VAO B.C. players
Washington Bullets draft picks
Washington Bullets players
21st-century African-American people
20th-century African-American sportspeople